Jinfeng Township is a mountain indigenous township in Taitung County, Taiwan. The main population is the Paiwan people of the Taiwanese aborigines.

Administrative divisions
 Jialan Village
 Zhengxing Village
 Xinxing Village
 Binmao Village
 Liqiu Village

External links

 Jinfeng Township Office, Taitung County 

Townships in Taitung County